John Stourton, 9th Baron Stourton (1553–1588) was the elder son of Charles Stourton, 8th Baron Stourton by his wife Anne Stanley, a daughter of Edward Stanley, 3rd Earl of Derby. His father was executed for murder when he was a small child, but the property passed to the son.

Life
He was one of the peers who tried Mary, Queen of Scots.

He married ca. 1580 Frances Brooke (b. 12 January 1562), daughter of Sir George Brooke, 10th Baron Cobham, by his second wife Frances Newton.

He was succeeded by his brother Edward Stourton, 10th Baron Stourton.

Notes

References
 Kidd, Charles and Williamson, David (editors). Debrett's Peerage and Baronetage (1995 edition). London: St. Martin's Press, 1995, 

1588 deaths
09
1553 births
16th-century English nobility